Cotton is a civil parish in the district of Staffordshire Moorlands, Staffordshire, England. It contains twelve listed buildings that are recorded in the National Heritage List for England. All the listed buildings are designated at Grade II, the lowest of the three grades, which is applied to "buildings of national importance and special interest".  The parish contains the village of Cotton, and is otherwise mainly rural.  The listed buildings consist of a college, two churches, farmhouses, a cottage and associated farm buildings, four mileposts, and a war memorial.


Buildings

References

Citations

Sources

Lists of listed buildings in Staffordshire